Anthony J. Powell (born January 5, 1962) was a Judge of the Kansas Court of Appeals, and he now serves as the Kansas Solicitor General.

Early life and education

Powell was born on January 5, 1962, in Saint Paul, Minnesota. He received his Bachelor of Arts in political science from George Washington University in 1985 and his Juris Doctor from Washburn University School of Law in 1991.

Legal career

From 2002, until his appointment to the Kansas Court of Appeals, Powell served as a judge for the Eighteenth Judicial District, which serves Sedgwick County.  Prior to that he was a member of the Kansas House of Representatives for eight years where he served as Majority Whip, and as chairman of several committees including Federal and State Affairs, Ethics and Elections, and the Joint Committee on State-Tribal Relations. He also served as vice-chairman of the Taxation Committee. Prior to his House service, he practiced law with the firm of Martin and Churchill.  He also served as Legislative Director to Congressman William Broomfield and as an intern on the staff of Senator Bob Dole.

Kansas Court of Appeals

He was appointed to the court by Governor Sam Brownback on January 12, 2013. He was appointed to the seat on the Kansas Court of Appeals formerly held by the late Chief Judge Richard D. Greene. He was retained by voters in 2014. Powell retired from the Kansas Court of Appeals on June 30, 2022. On August 26, 2022, Governor Laura Kelly nominated Judge Rachel L. Pickering as Powell's successor. Pickering was unanimously confirmed by the Kansas Senate on January 22, 2023.

Consideration for Kansas Supreme Court

Powell was one of fourteen candidates who applied for a seat on the Kansas Supreme Court vacated by Nancy Moritz.

Kansas Solicitor General 
On December 18, 2022, Powell was named the Kansas Solicitor General, Kansas' top appellate attorney, by then Kansas Attorney General-elect Kris Kobach. Following the start of Kobach's term, Powell succeeded Brant Laue as Kansas Solicitor General on January 9, 2023.

Personal

Powell and his wife, Betty, have been married for over 25 years and they have four children. He is a member of Central Christian Church, Wichita, Kansas.

References

External links
Official Biography on Kansas Judicial Branch website

Living people
1962 births
20th-century American lawyers
20th-century American politicians
21st-century American judges
Columbian College of Arts and Sciences alumni
Kansas Court of Appeals Judges
Kansas lawyers
Kansas state court judges
Members of the Kansas House of Representatives
People from Saint Paul, Minnesota
Washburn University alumni